Simiutaq Island is a  uninhabited island in the Qeqqata municipality in western Greenland, located in the mouth of the long Kangerlussuaq Fjord. It was also known informally as Cruncher Island.

Supply ships of Royal Arctic Line and cruise ships, such as Norway's Hurtigruten sail into Kangerlussuaq Fjord south of the island. The fjord is navigable in its entire length, with the ships mooring at the Kangerlussuaq port, west of Kangerlussuaq Airport. There are several small skerries in the mouth of the fjord, at the southern end of Simiutaq Island.

Geography 
The island is located on the shores of Davis Strait, separated from the mainland by the Amerluunguaq Strait in the north, and by the main arm of the Kangerlussuaq Fjord in the southeast.
Its name is a generic Inuit name for an island at the head of a fjord. It should not be confused with Simiutaq (near Qaqortoq) in southwest Greenland.

Simiutaq is not an outlying island; it would have been a continuation of the landmass in the north were it not for the narrow and shallow Amerlunnguaq Strait, which branches to the west off Kangerlussuaq Fjord near the mouth of the latter.

Promontories

Settlement 

History

See also
Bluie
List of islands of Greenland

References 

Davis Strait
Uninhabited islands of Greenland
ceb:Cruncher Island (pulo sa Grenland)
sv:Cruncher Island (ö i Grönland)